Elwyn Roberts (1931-2009) was a Welsh, Anglican priest.

Roberts was educated at  Bangor University, Keble College, Oxford  and St Michael's College, Llandaff. He was ordained deacon in 1955 and priest in 1956. After a curacy in Bangor he was Librarian of St Michael's College, Llandaff. He was Vicar of St David, Bangor from 1966 to 1971; and Rector of St George, Llandudno from 1971 to 1983. He was Archdeacon of Merioneth from 1983 to 1986; and Archdeacon of Bangor from 1986 to 1999.

References

1931 births
Archdeacons of Bangor
20th-century Welsh Anglican priests
Alumni of St Michael's College, Llandaff
Alumni of Bangor University
Alumni of Keble College, Oxford
21st-century Welsh Anglican priests
2009 deaths
Archdeacons of Merioneth